Daniel Acharuparambil (12 May 1939 – 26 October 2009) was a Roman Catholic Indian Archbishop of the Roman Catholic Archdiocese of Verapoly in Kerala. Ordained to the priesthood on 14 March 1966, he was named Archbishop and was consecrated on 3 November 1996.

Profile 

Daniel Acharuparambil, the Archbishop of Verapoly, was a member of Discalced Carmelite Order, Manjummel Province, Kerala, India. He was born of Rocky and Monica Acharuparambil in Palliport, in Kerala, India, on 12 May 1939.

After his School-Leaving Examination he joined the Carmelite order at Ernakulam in May 1956. He completed his philosophy and theology courses at St. Joseph’s Pontifical Seminary, Alwaye and was ordained priest on 14 March 1966. He acquired a bachelor-degree in Economics, Licentiate in Philosophy and a Master-degree in Indian Philosophy from University of Kerala, Pontifical Athenaeum in Poona and Banaras Hindu University in Varanasi respectively.

In 1972 he started teaching at Pontifical Urbaniana University (P.U.U), Rome. In 1978 Acharuparambil was awarded a Ph.D. from [[Pontifical University of St. Thomas Aquinas|Pontifical University of St. Thomas Aquinas, Angelicum]], Rome with a dissertation entitled The destiny of man in the evolutionary thought of Sri Aurobindo''.

In 1986 he became Dean of the Faculty of Missiology at P.U.U. From 1988 to 1994, i.e. for two terms, he also served as rector magnificus at P.U.U.

He was consulter of the Pontifical Council for Inter-religious Dialogue for 5 years from 1990. He was also consulter of the Congregation for Evangelization of the Peoples, a member of the Pontifical Council for Inter-religious Duologue.

He was nominated Archbishop on 5 August 1996 and was consecrated at Ernakulam on 3 November 1996 by Josef Cardinal Tomko, Prefect of the Congregation for the Evangelization of Peoples, Rome. The same day he received the Pallium.

He was the President of Kerala Regional Latin Catholic Council, President of Metropolitan Archbishop, President of K. C. B. C, Chairman of Kerala Catholic Bishops Council, President of Kerala Catholic Bishops Council and Archbishop of Verapoly.

Life through years
12 May 1939 – Born at Palliport
14 Mar 1966 – Ordained Priest – Priest of Order of Discalced Carmelites
14 Jun 1996 – Appointed Archbishop of Verapoly, India
3 Nov 1996 – Consecrated Bishop – Archbishop of Verapoly, India
24 Oct 2008 – Appointed Apostolic Administrator of Cochin, India
8 May 2009 – Resigned Apostolic Administrator of Cochin, India

Teaching responsibilities
1972 to 1996 Pontificia Universita Urbaniana
1 March 1994 Ordinary Professor
13 May 1981 Extraordinary Professor
1973 – 1983 Pontificia Universita Lateranense
1976 Pontificia Facolta Teologica,"Teresianum"
1980 Visiting Professor, Teresian Institute of Spirituality, Kalamasery
1977 Instituto Studi Asiatici, of P.I.M.E. Fathers Milano;
1977 Seminario Vescovile di Padova; Intensive course on Hinduism .

Other higher responsibilities
1986 – 1988 Dean of the Faculty of Missiology, P.U.U.
1988 – 1991 Rettore Magnifico of P.U.U.
1990 – 1995 Consultor of the Pontificial Council – for Inter-religious Dialogue
1991 – 1996 Consultor of the Congregation – for Evangelization of Peoples
1996– Pontifical Council for Inter-religious Dialogue

See also
 Roman Catholic Archdiocese of Verapoly

Notes

1939 births
2009 deaths
20th-century Roman Catholic archbishops in India
People from Ernakulam district
Discalced Carmelite bishops
Academic staff of the Pontifical Urban University
21st-century Roman Catholic archbishops in India